The 2022 Cronulla-Sutherland Sharks season was the 56th in the club's history. The club was coached by Craig Fitzgibbon in his first season with the Sharks and captained by Wade Graham. The team competed in the National Rugby League's 2022 Telstra Premiership.

Milestones 
Round 1: Matt Ikuvalu made his debut for the club, after previously playing for the Sydney Roosters.
Round 1: Nicho Hynes made his debut for the club, after previously playing for the Melbourne Storm and kicked his 1st goal for the club.
Round 1: Dale Finucane made his debut for the club, after previously playing for the Melbourne Storm.
Round 1: Matt Moylan kicked his 1st field goal for the club.
Round 2: Sione Katoa played his 50th career and club game.
Round 2: Cameron McInnes made his debut for the club, after previously playing for the St. George Illawarra Dragons.
Round 3: Matt Moylan played his 150th career game.
Round 3: Matt Ikuvalu scored his 1st try for the club.
Round 3: Nicho Hynes kicked his 1st career field goal for the club.
Round 4: Aiden Tolman played his 300th career game.
Round 6: Toby Rudolf played his 50th career and club game.
Round 7: William Kennedy played his 50th career and club game.
Round 8: Siosifa Talakai played his 50th career game.
Round 8: Nicho Hynes played his 50th career game.
Round 11: Lachlan Miller made his NRL debut and scored his 1st career try for the club.
Round 12: Andrew Fifita played his 200th game for the club.
Round 12: Ronaldo Mulitalo played his 50th career and club game.
Round 12: Tom Hazelton made his NRL debut for the club.
Round 12: Cameron McInnes scored his 1st try for the club.
Round 18: Jesse Colquhoun made his NRL debut for the club.
Round 18: Connor Tracey played his 50th career game.
Round 20: Connor Tracey played his 50th game for the club.
Round 21: Kade Dykes made his NRL debut for the club.
Round 22: Cameron McInnes played his 150th career game.
Round 22: Kade Dykes scored his 1st career try for the club.
Round 24: Kayal Iro made his NRL debut for the club.
Finals Week 1: Andrew Fifita played his 250th career game.

Fixtures

Pre-season

Source:

Regular season

Source:

Finals series

Ladder

Squad

Player movements

Recruited

Released

Player appearances

Representative honours

Squad statistics

NSWRL Major Comps

Knock-On Effect NSW Cup (Newtown Jets)

Pre-season

Regular season

Finals series

Jersey Flegg Cup (U21s)

Regular season

Harvey Norman Women's Premiership

Regular season

Finals series

NSWRL Junior Reps

SG Ball Cup (U19s)

Regular season

Harold Matthews Cup (U17s)

Regular season

Finals series

Tarsha Gale Cup (U19s)

Regular season

Awards

2022 Dally M Awards
Held at Randwick Racecourse, Sydney on Wednesday, 28 September.
Dally M Player of the Year: Nicho Hynes
Provan-Summons Medallist: Nicho Hynes
Dally M Halfback of the Year: Nicho Hynes

Sharks Awards Night
Held at Doltone House, Sylvania Waters, Sydney on Friday, 23 September.
Porter Gallen Medal and Pontifex Player of the Year: Nicho Hynes
Porter Gallen Nominees: Nicho Hynes, Briton Nikora, Blayke Brailey, Toby Rudolf & Cameron McInnes
Tommy Bishop Players Player: Briton Nikora
Steve Rogers Rookie of the Year: Lachlan Miller
Members Player of the Year: Nicho Hynes
Sharks Have Heart Community Award: Nicho Hynes
Iron Man: Blayke Brailey
Andrew Ettingshausen Club Person of the Year: Daniel Holdsworth
Wellbeing and Education Excellence: Andrew Fifita (NRL) & Toby Boothroyd (Jersey Flegg)
Jersey Flegg - Gavin Miller Player of the Year: Blake Hosking
Jersey Flegg - Greg Pierce Players Player: Blake Hosking

Women's Awards Night
Held at Sharks at Kareela, Sydney on Friday, 29 July.
Women’s Player of the Year: Holli Wheeler
Harvey Norman Women’s Premiership Player of the Year: Holli Wheeler
Harvey Norman Women’s Premiership Coaches Award: Brooke Anderson
Tarsha Gale Player of the Year: Kirsty Sant
Tarsha Gale Coaches Award: Chloe Boston

Junior Rep Awards Night
Held at Sharks at Kareela, Sydney on Thursday, 16 June.
Greg Pierce Sharks Junior Representative Player of the Year: Chevy Stewart
Harold Matthews Cup Player of the Year: Chevy Stewart
Harold Matthews Cup Coaches Award: Max McCarthy
SG Ball Player of the Year: Lachlan Crouch
SG Ball Coaches Award: Chaz Jarvis

Rugby League Players’ Association Awards
Dennis Tutty Award: Wade Graham
2022 Academic Team of the Year: Andrew Fifita

Other awards
Ken Stephen Medal finalist: Nicho Hynes
Ken Stephen Medal nominee & NRL Community Team of the Year: Nicho Hynes

Footnotes

References

Cronulla-Sutherland Sharks
Cronulla-Sutherland Sharks seasons